The church of St Mary-the-Virgin in Horsell is an Anglican church in the Diocese of Guildford. It is located about one mile away from Woking town centre.
The current Vicar is Dmitry Lutsenko. The church is a Grade II* listed building.

Services
On Sundays the Church has three services: 8am, 10am and 9:30 pm. There are usually two Christingle services on Christmas Eve.

History
Parts of the west wall of the nave may date from the middle of the 12th century.

19th century restorations included:
 Removal of the screen in 1840.
 Replacement of the chancel and extension of the nave and south aisle eastwards in 1890.
 The north aisle and vestries were added in 1909.
 The Holy Trinity Chapel was added in 1910.
 The baptistry was added in 1921.

External links
St Mary the Virgin
Diocese of Guildford

References

Church of England church buildings in Surrey
Diocese of Guildford
Horsell